
List of Golden Harvest productions, per the official Golden Harvest website.

1970 - 1971 -
1972 - 1973 -
1974 - 1975 -
1976 - 1977 -
1978 - 1979

1980 - 1981 -
1982 - 1983 -
1984 - 1985 -
1986 - 1987 -
1988 - 1989

1990 - 1991 -
1992 - 1993 -
1994 - 1995 -
1996 - 1997 -
1998 - 1999

2000 - 2001 -
2002 - 2003 -

2010 - 2014 -
2015 -

1970
The Angry River (鬼怒川)
The Last Duel (俠義雙雄)
The Invincible Eight (天龍八將)

1971
The Blade Spares None (刀不留人)
The Fast Sword (奪命金劍)
Thunderbolt (五雷轟頂)
The Comet Strikes (鬼流星)
The Hurricane (金旋風)
The Chase (追擊)
The Invincible Sword (一夫當關)
Bandits from Shantung (山東響馬)
The Big Boss (唐山大兄)

1972
Beach of the War Gods (戰神灘)
Deadly China Doll
Lady Whirlwind (鐵掌旋風腿)
One Armed Boxer (獨臂拳王)
Sonny Come Home (拳頭枕頭)
Stormy Sun (烈日狂風)
Fist of Fury (精武門)
The Man Called Tiger (冷面虎)
Way of the Dragon (猛龍過江)
Hapkido (合氣道)
Four Winds (東南西北風)
Seven Magnificent Fights (海員七號)

1973
Girl of the Night (夜女郎)
The Fate of Lee Khan (迎春閣之風波)
The Unscrupulous General (糊塗大將軍)
The Story of Daisy (心蘭的故事)
Back Alley Princess (馬路小英雄)
Game of Death (死亡遊戲)
The Devil's Treasure (黑夜怪客)
Kung Fu Girl (鐵娃)
Enter the Dragon (龍爭虎鬥)

1974
When Taekwondo Strikes (跆拳震九州)
The Queen Bee (女王蜂)
The Tattooed Dragon (龍虎金剛)
The Skyhawk (黃飛鴻少林拳)
Whiplash (虎辮子)
Bruce Lee: The Man & the Legend (李小龍的生與死)
Tiger of Northland (北地虎)
The Shrine of Ultimate Bliss aka Stoner (鐵金剛大破紫陽觀)
The Manchu Boxer (七省拳王)
Shaolin Boxers (福建少林拳)
The Bedevilled (心魔)
Chinatown Capers (小英雄大鬧唐人街)

1975
Slaughter in San Francisco (黃面老虎)
Chinatown Capers (小英雄大鬧唐人街)
Badge 369 (三六九)
The Dragon Tamers (女子跆拳群英會)
The Association (艷窟神探)
Naughty! Naughty! (綽頭狀元)
The Young Dragons (鐵漢柔情)
The Tournament (中泰拳壇生死戰)
All in the Family (花飛滿城春)

1976
Games Gamblers Play (鬼馬雙星)
The Man from Hong Kong (直搗黃龍)
The Seven Coffin (驅魔女)
Naughtier Than Three (綽頭皇上皇)
My Wacky, Wacky World (大千世界)
No End of Surprises (拍案驚奇)
The Last Message (天才與白痴)

1977
Hand of Death (少林門)
A Queen's Ransom (鱷譚群英會)
The Himalayan (密宗聖手)
The Double Crossers (鬼計雙雄)
Spring Time in Pattaya (春滿巴堤雅)
Confession of a Concubine (宮人我要)
Princess Chang Ping (帝女花)
Chelsia, My Love (秋霞)
Elmo Takes a Bride (阿茂正傳)
Gonna Get You (溫拿與教叔)

1978
The Amsterdam Kill
The Boys in Company C
Game of Death (死亡遊戲)
The Private Eyes (半斤八兩)
The Shaolin Plot (四大門派)
The Iron-Fisted Monk (三德和尚與舂米六)
Broken Oath (破戒)
The Lady Killer (鬼馬姑爺仔)
Naked Comes the Huntress (貂女)
Rainbow in My Heart (第二度道彩虹)
Making It (追趕跑跳碰)
Money Crazy (發錢寒)
Ironside 426 (四二六)
Follow the Star (大煞星與小鬼頭)

1979
The Contract (賣身契)
Mr. Big (大路元帥)
Warriors Two (贊先生與找錢華)
Itchy Fingers (神偷妙探手多多)
Hello, Late Homecomers (Hello ! 夜歸人)
Vice Squad 633 (六三三)
The Hellfire Angel (亡命嬌娃)
Last Hurrah for Chivalry (豪俠)
Payoff (毒計)
Knockabout (雜家小子)
Tower of Death (死亡塔)
The Cheeky Chap (壞小子)
Magnificent Butcher (林世榮)
The Young Master (師弟出馬)

1980
Murder Most Foul (慌失失)
The Sword (名劍)
The Happenings (夜車)
From Riches to Rags (錢作怪)
Gallery of Fools (哥門的糗事)
The Phantom Killer (粉骷髏)
The Mortal Storm (風塵)
Spooky Encounters (鬼打鬼)
Security Unlimited (摩登保鑣)
Dreadnaught (勇者無懼)
The Breakthrough (衝破黑漩渦)
Once Upon A Time (舊夢不須記)
Wedding Bells, Wedding Belles (公子嬌)
Dragon Lord (龍少爺)
The Big Brawl (殺手壕)

1981
The Cannonball Run (English production)
Death Hunt
The Postman Fights Back (巡城馬)
Super Fool (龍咁威)
The Prodigal Son (敗家仔)
The Hired Guns (凶蠍)
The Miracle Fighters (奇門遁甲)
Tower of Death (死亡塔)
Sweet Vengeance (復仇者)
To Hell with the Devil (摩登天師)
Duel to the Death (生死決)
The Dead and the Deadly (人嚇人)
Plain Jane to the Rescue (八彩林亞珍)
Zu Warriors from the Magic Mountain (蜀生)
The Trail (追鬼七雄)

1982
Project A (A計劃)
Hocus Pocus (人嚇鬼)
Winners and Sinners (奇謀妙計五福星)
Profile in Anger (無名火)
Megaforce
Deadly Eyes
Teppanyaki (鐵板燒)
The Body Is Willing (狂情)
Lost Generation (風水廿年)
Pom Pom (神勇雙響炮)
And Now, What's Your Name? (先生貴姓)

1983
Long Arm of the Law (省港旗兵)
Big Mouth C.I.D (摩登捕快)
Hero Shed No Tears (英雄無淚)
Wheels on Meals (快餐車)
Fingers on Triggers (夾心沙展)
The Disciples of Shaolin (少林俗家弟子)
Bruce Lee, the Legend (李小龍生與死)
Winner Takes All (有Friend冇驚)
Hong Kong 1941 (等待黎明)
Those Merry Souls (時來運轉)
High Road to China
The Champions (波牛)

1984
Cannonball Run II (English production)
Funny Triple (開心三嚮炮)
Lassiter
Rosa (神勇雙嚮炮續集)
My Lucky Stars (福星高照)
Affectionately Yours (花仔多情)
Merry Go Round (鬼馬朱唇)
Police Story (警察故事)
Mr. Heavenly Lover (我的愛神)
Crazy Romance (求愛反斗星)
Mr. Vampire (殭屍先生)
Heart of the Dragon (龍的心)
Witch from Nepal (奇緣)
Death Wish (死亡之愿)

1985
Seven Angels (歡場)
Twinkle, Twinkle Lucky Stars (夏日福星)
Strange Bedfellow (兩公婆八條心)
Armour of God (龍兄虎弟)
Goodbye Mammie (再見媽咪)
Young But Angry (青春怒潮)
Why, Why, Tell Me Why (壞女孩)
Happy Ding Dong (歡樂叮噹)
My Cousin, the Ghost (表哥到)
Naughty Boys (扭計離牌軍)
Bitter Taste of Blood (亡命天涯)
The Final Test (最後一戰)
Midnight Girls (午夜麗人)
The Seventh Curse (原振俠與衛斯理)
The Protector (威龍猛探)

1986
Lucky Stars Go Places (最佳福星)
Happy Go Lucky (開心快活人)
That Enchanting Night (良宵花弄月)
A Hearty Response (義蓋雲天)
Righting Wrongs (執法先鋒)
Scared Stiff (小生夢驚魂)
Mr. Vampire II (殭屍家族)
Chaos by Design (愛情謎語)
Midnight Whisper (盡訴心中情)
Millionaire's Express (富貴列車)
Paper Marriage (過埠新娘)
The Happy Bigamist (一屋兩妻)
Immortal Story (海上花)
The Scalper (母牛一條)
The Yesman (跟屁蟲)
Gallery of Fools (哥們的糗事)

1987
Chocolate Inspector (神探朱古力)
The Haunted Cop Shop (猛鬼差館)
China's Last Eunuch (中國最後一個太監)
Sworn Brothers (肝膽相照)
Miss Hong Kong (香港小姐寫真)
Breadline Blues (母牛一條)
Killer's Nocturne (不夜天)
Eastern Condors (東方禿鷹)
Project A Part II (A計劃續集)
Flaming Brothers (江湖龍虎鬥)
The Big Brother (一哥)
Promising Young Boy (OK仔)
Rouge (胭脂扣)
The Inspector Wears Skirts (霸王花)

1988
Long Arm of the Law II (省港旗兵續集)
To Err Is Humane (標錯參)
Spiritual Love (鬼新娘)
Three Against the World (群龍奪寶)
Profile of Pleasure (群鶯亂舞)
Tokyo Doll (東京俏姑娘)
Mr. Vampire III (靈幻道士)
Couples, Couples, Couples (三對鴛鴦一張床)
One Husband Too Many (一妻兩夫)
Femme Fatale (最毒婦人心)
Painted Faces (七小福)
Picture of a Nymph (畫中仙)
Lady Reporter (師姐大晒)
Her Vengeance (血玫瑰)
Dragons Forever (飛龍猛將)

1989
Moon, Stars & Sun (月亮、星星、太陽)
Police Story Part II (警察故事續集)
On the Run (亡命鴛鴦)
Mr. Vampire IV (殭屍叔叔)
The Greatest Lover (公子多情)
Vampire Vs. Vampire (一眉道人)
Peacock King (孔雀王子)
The Bachelor's Swan Song (再見王老五)
Jail House Eros (監嶽不設防)
Four Loves (四千金)
Burning Sensation (火燭鬼)
The Inspector Wears Skirts II (神勇飛虎霸王花)
Sentenced To Hang (三狼奇案)

1990
Teenage Mutant Ninja Turtles (English production)
Mr Canton and Lady Rose (奇蹟)
I Am Sorry (說謊的女人)
Reincarnation of Golden Lorus (潘金蓮之前世今生)
The Yuppie Fantasia (小男人週記)
In Between Loves (求愛夜驚魂)
Mr. Smart (瀟洒先生)
The Iceman Cometh (急凍奇俠)
Sentenced to Hang (三狼奇案)
She Shoots Straight (皇家女將)
Forever Young (返老還童)
A Fishy Story (不脫襪的人)
What a Small World (我愛唐人街)
Doctor's Heart (救命宣言)
Stage Door Johnny (舞台姊妹)
Shanghai Shanghai (亂世兒女)
Saga of the Phoenix (阿修羅)
Do Unto the Others (嶽鳳之再戰江湖)
On Parole (嶽鳳之還我清白)

1991
Teenage Mutant Ninja Turtles II: The Secret of the Ooze (English production)
Fatal Vacation (安樂戰場)
Her Fatal Ways (表姐你好)
Brief Encounter In Shinjuku (錯在新宿)
Angry Ranger (火爆浪子)
To Spy with Love (小心間碟)
Till Death Shall We Start (衰鬼撬牆腳)
Hand in Hand (黃師父走天涯)
The 1000 Years Cat (老貓)
Farewell China (愛在別鄉的季節)
The Masters (龍行天下)
Rebel from China (勇闖天下尸)
Mortuary Blues (屍家重地)
The Lost Souls (富貴開心鬼)
Till We Meet Again (何日君再來)
The Yesman (跟屁蟲)
Sex and Zen (玉蒲團)
Police Story III (警察故事III)

1992
Lover-At-Large (難得有情郎)
Finale In Blood (大鬧廣昌隆)
Riki-Oh: The Story of Ricky (力王)
Point of No Return (一觸即發)
Kawashima Yoshiko (川島芳子)
Queen's Bench III (古惑大律師)
Bury Me High (霸王卸甲)
Palette (Operation Scorpio) (漫畫神拳)
Armour of God II: Operation Condor (飛鷹計劃)
Erotic Ghost Story (聊齋艷譚)
Underground Express (地下通道)
Doctor Vampire (殭屍醫生)
The Monster Wore Jeans aka The Blue Jean Monster (著牛仔褲的鍾馗)
Story of Kennedy Town (西環的故事)
Pretty Ghost (我老婆唔係人)
Coup de Grace (起尾注)
The Inspector Wears Skirts IV (92霸王花與霸王花)
Death Wish 2 (死亡愿望2)

1993
Teenage Mutant Ninja Turtles III (English production)
Freedom Run (太子爺出差)
Changing Partner (夜夜伴肥嬌)
Sunshine Friends (笑聲撞地球)
Manhattan Sunrise (買起曼克頓)
A Charmed Live (一世好命)
Erotic Ghost Story II (聊齋艷譚續集)
Once Upon a Time in China (黃飛鴻)
Once Upon a Time in China II (黃飛鴻II)
When Fortune Smiles (無敵幸運星)
To Be Number One (跛豪)
Invincible (戰龍在野)
Her Fatal Ways II (表姐你好II)
Robotrix (女機械人)
Inspector Pink Dragon (神探馬如龍)
The Top Bet (賭霸)
The Shootout (槍戰(危險情人)

1994
Zodiac Hunters (極度追蹤)
Twin Dragons (雙龍會)
Erotic Ghost Story III (燈草和尚)
Fruit Punch (YES一族)
Center Stage (阮玲玉)
Her Fatal Ways III (表姐你好III)
Fist of Fury (精武門)
1 or 2 Things in Late Spring (晚春情事)
Crazy Safari (非洲和尚)
Dances with the Dragon (與龍共舞)
Arrest the Restless (藍剛之反飛組風雲)
Royal Tramp (廘鼎記I)
Royal Tramp II (廘鼎記II)
Infatuation (半段情)
100 Ways to Kill Your Wife (殺妻二人組)
Ghost Snatchers (俾鬼捉)
Love Me & My Dad (又見冤家)
Cherry Blossom (少年郭達夫)
Flirting Scholar (挑情)
Born to Gamble (爛賭英雄傳)
Cream Soda & Milk (忌廉溝鮮奶)
The Home at HK (家在香港)
Song of the Exile (客途秋恨)
S.T.A.B. (GOLD) (特工隊勇襲機場)
H-Bomb (Great Friday) (氫彈大勒索)
Gold Hunter (老鼠街)
Read Lips (孖寶闖八關)

1995
All for the Winner (賭聖)
Queen of the Underworld (霞姐-夜生活女王)
Truant Heroes (逃學英雄傳)
She Starts the Fire (噴火女郎)
Osmanthus Alley (桂花巷)
Flag of Honor (旗正飄飄)
The Terrorist (恐怖分子)
The Killer Meteors (風雨雙流星)
To Kill with Intrigue (劍花煙雨江南)
Snake & Crane Arts of Shaolin (蛇鶴八步)
Half a Loaf of Kung Fu (一招半式闖江湖)
Who Holds the Golden Key (金鎖匙)
Magnificent Bodyguards (飛渡捲雲山)
Spiritual Kung Fu (拳精)
Dragon Fist (龍拳)
The Fearless Hyena (笑拳怪招)
The Challenger (踢館)
Boss of Shanghai (上海灘大亨)
A Wily Match (一對活寶跑天下)
The Loot (賊贓)
The Rebellious Reign雍正與年羹堯
Living and Loving (女兒心)
The Crazy Chase (何方神聖)
Dangerous Person (危險人物)
Modern Detective (摩登神探)
Energetic 21 (衝激21)
Fearless Hyena Part II (龍騰虎躍)
Devil Fetus (魔胎)
The Ghost Informer (鬼線人)
The Young Taoism Fighter (陰陽奇兵)
Taoism Drunkard (鬼馬天師)
Lucky Diamond (祝您好運)
The Express (生命快車)
Hong Kong Graffiti (女人風情話)
Dark Night (暗夜)
Magic Story (殭屍少爺)
Walking Beside Me (心動)
Split of the Spirit (厲鬼纏身)
A Heroic Fight (勇闖江湖)
Magic of Spell (驅魔童)
All Night Long (夜瘋狂)
Ghost Fever (鬼溝人)
The Girl with Dexterous Touch (金粉神仙手)
Little Sister in Law (小姨懷春)
Shantung Man in Hong Kong (小山東到香港)
The Kung Fu Kid (鐵拳小子)
Body For Sale (賣身)
New Fist of Fury (新精武門)
Shaolin Wooden Men (少林木人巷)
Mary from Beijing (夢醒時分)
That Beast in Homicide (警察故事4之簡單任務)
Five Lonely Quintet (五個寂寞的心)
Sting of the Scorpion (蠍子之策反行動)
Murder Made to Order (蠍子之滅反行動)
Those Were the Days... (歲月風雲)
Those Were the Days II (歲月風雲續集)
Rapist Beckon (情債)
City Hunter (城市獵人)
Iron Monkey (鐵馬騮)
Once Upon a Time in China III (黃飛鴻三之獅王爭霸)
King of Beggars (武狀元蘇乞兒)
Key to Fortune (私鐘真面目)
3 Days of a Blind Girl (盲女七十二小時)
Super Lady Cop (超級女警察)
Millionaire Cop (千面天王)
Naked Killer (赤裸羔羊)
Death Wish 3 (死亡愿望3)

1996
Top Banana Club (金裝香蕉俱樂部)
Banana Club (正牌香蕉俱樂部)
Final Option 2: Best Of The Best (飛虎雄心2之傲氣比天高)
Young and Dangerous 3 (古惑仔3之隻手遮天)
Blind Romance (偷偷愛你)
Sexy and Dangerous (古惑女之決戰江湖)
Sex and Zen II (玉蒲團二之玉女心經)
Ebola Syndrome (伊波拉病毒)
The Blade (刀)
Police Story 4: First Strike (警察故事4之簡單任務)
Hu Du Men (虎度門)
The Imp (孽慾追擊檔案之邪殺)
Big Bullet (衝鋒隊怒火街頭)
Evening Liaison (人約黃昏)
The Story of Ah Kam (阿金)
Lost and Found (天涯海角)
Comrades: Almost a Love Story (甜蜜蜜)
Viva Erotica (色情男女)
God of Gamblers 3: The Early Stage (賭神3之少年賭神)
Feel 100% (百分百?Feel)
He's a Woman, She's a Man 2 (金枝玉葉2)

1997
A Queer Story (基佬40)
2am (夜半2點鐘)
Mr. Nice Guy (一個好人)
The Peeping Tom (赤足驚魂)
Young and Dangerous 4 (97古惑仔戰無不勝)
The Wedding Days (完全結婚手冊)
Yesteryou, Yesterme 3 (記得…香蕉成熟時III為妳鐘情)

Downtown Torpedoes (神偷諜影)
Stand Behind the Yellow Line (生日多戀事)
The Soong Sisters (宋家皇朝)
Working for Missu (給太太打工)
Intimates (自梳)
Too Many Ways to Be No. 1 (一個字頭的誕生)
Love Is Not a Game, But a Joke (飛一般愛情小說)
Kitchen (我愛廚房)
We're No Bad Guys (愛上百分百英雄)
Task Force (熱血最強)
The Mad Phoenix (南海十三郎)
Death Wish 4: The Crackdown (死亡愿望4：镇压)

1998
Who Am I? (我是誰)
Anna Magdalena (安娜瑪德蓮娜)
Portland Street Blues (古惑仔情義篇之洪興十三妹)
Young and Dangerous 5 (98古惑仔龍爭虎鬥)
Young and Dangerous: The Prequel (新古惑仔之少年激鬥篇)
The Stormriders (風雲雄霸天下)
Project B (B計劃)
Enter the Eagles (渾身是膽)
City of Glass (玻璃之城)
The Lord of Hangzhou (杭州王爺)
Hot War (幻影特攻)
Till Death Do Us Part (我愛你)
Hold You Tight (愈快樂愈墮落)

1999
A Man Called Hero (中華英雄)
Fly Me to Polaris (星願)
Gorgeous (玻璃樽)
Sunshine Cops (陽光警察)
Rave Fever (周末狂熱)

2000
Tokyo Raiders (東京攻略)
I Q Dudettes (辣椒教室)
Dial D for Demon (炭燒凶咒)
When I Fall in Love... with Both (月亮的秘密)
12 Nights (12夜)
And I Hate You So (小親親)
Born to Be King (勝者為王)
Summer Holidays (夏日的麼麼茶)
Home Sweet Home (千年等一天)
Double Tap (鎗王)
Marooned (藍煙火)
Skyline Cruisers (神偷次世代)
Lavender (薰衣草)

2001
The Accidental Spy (特務迷城)
Sharp Guns (險角)
Goodbye Mr. Cool (九龍冰室)
Love Insurance (愛情保險)
Para Para Sakura (芭啦芭啦櫻之花)
Extreme Challenge (地上最強)
Stolen Love (別戀)
You Shoot, I Shoot (買兇拍人)
2002 (異靈靈異)

2002
Marry a Rich Man (嫁個有錢人)
Gu A Gu (股啊股)
Interactive Murder (互動殺人事件)
Loving Him (停不了的愛)

2003
My Lucky Star (行運超人)

2010
You Deserve to Be Single (活该你单身)
The Child's Eye (童眼)

2013
No Man's Land (無人區)

2014
The Deathday Party (死亡派對)

2015
Fly Me To Venus (星語心願之再愛)

References

Golden Harvest
Golden
Golden